Podolsk is a rural locality (a selo) and the administrative centre of Tanalyksky Selsoviet, Khaybullinsky District, Bashkortostan, Russia. The population was 1,083 as of 2010. There are 12 streets.

Geography 
Podolsk is located 27 km northeast of Akyar (the district's administrative centre) by road. Bakalovka is the nearest rural locality.

References 

Rural localities in Khaybullinsky District